Mechtatel is the sixth album by Russian singer-songwriter Dima Bilan. It was recorded in Russia and the United States in collaboration with Jim Beanz and J.R. Rotem.
A bonus disc version was published with an attached DVD contains the official videos of five songs.

Track listing

DVD Track listing

References 

2010 albums
Dima Bilan albums